Events from the year 1871 in Brazil.

Incumbents
Monarch – Pedro II
Prime Minister – Marquis of São Vicente (until 7 March), Viscount of Rio Branco (starting 7 March)

Events
September 28 - Law of Free Birth, or Rio Branco Law, passed by Brazilian Parliament, intending to provide freedom to all newborn children of slaves, and slaves of the state or crown.

Births
August 27 - , politician from Minas Gerais (died 1946)
September 12 - , general (died 1964)

Deaths
February 7 - Princess Leopoldina of Brazil, daughter of Pedro II
July 6 - Castro Alves, poet
August 11 -, politician (born 1800)
August 25 - José de Aquino Pinheiro, colonel of the Brazilian National Guard
November 22 - , baron and viscount (born 1831)

References

 
1870s in Brazil
Years of the 19th century in Brazil
Brazil
Brazil